Stephen Smith (February 19, 1823 – August 27, 1922) was an American surgeon and a pioneer in public health.

Biography
He was born on February 19, 1823, in Skaneateles, New York. His father was a cavalry officer in the American Revolutionary War.

Smith was an active proponent of the Metropolitan Health Bill. He led the establishment of the Metropolitan Board of Health in New York City in 1866, the first such public health agency in the United States. In 1875, he was elected as a member to the American Philosophical Society. He later founded the American Public Health Association. He died on August 27, 1922.

The Stephen Smith Medal, for distinguished contributions in public health was created in his honor.

References

External links

 Biography at New York City government web site
 Letter from Smith following the founding of the APHA
 History of the American Public Health Association
 

1823 births
1922 deaths
American surgeons
American public health doctors
Healthcare in New York City
New York University Grossman School of Medicine alumni
People from Skaneateles, New York
New York City Department of Health and Mental Hygiene